Provincial Secretary of Prince Edward Island v Egan, [1941] S.C.R. 396 is a famous constitutional decision of the Supreme Court of Canada.The Court upheld a provincial Act, which provided that anyone who was convicted of an impaired driving offence under the Criminal Code will have their licence suspended, on the basis that the law was in relation to the regulation of highway safety which is a valid provincial subject.

The case later became central to another key constitutional decision of O'Grady v. Sparling, [1960] S.C.R. 804.

See also
 List of Supreme Court of Canada cases (Richards Court through Fauteux Court)

External links
 

Canadian federalism case law
Supreme Court of Canada cases
Supreme Court of Canada case articles without infoboxes
1941 in Canadian case law